= Yan Xiao =

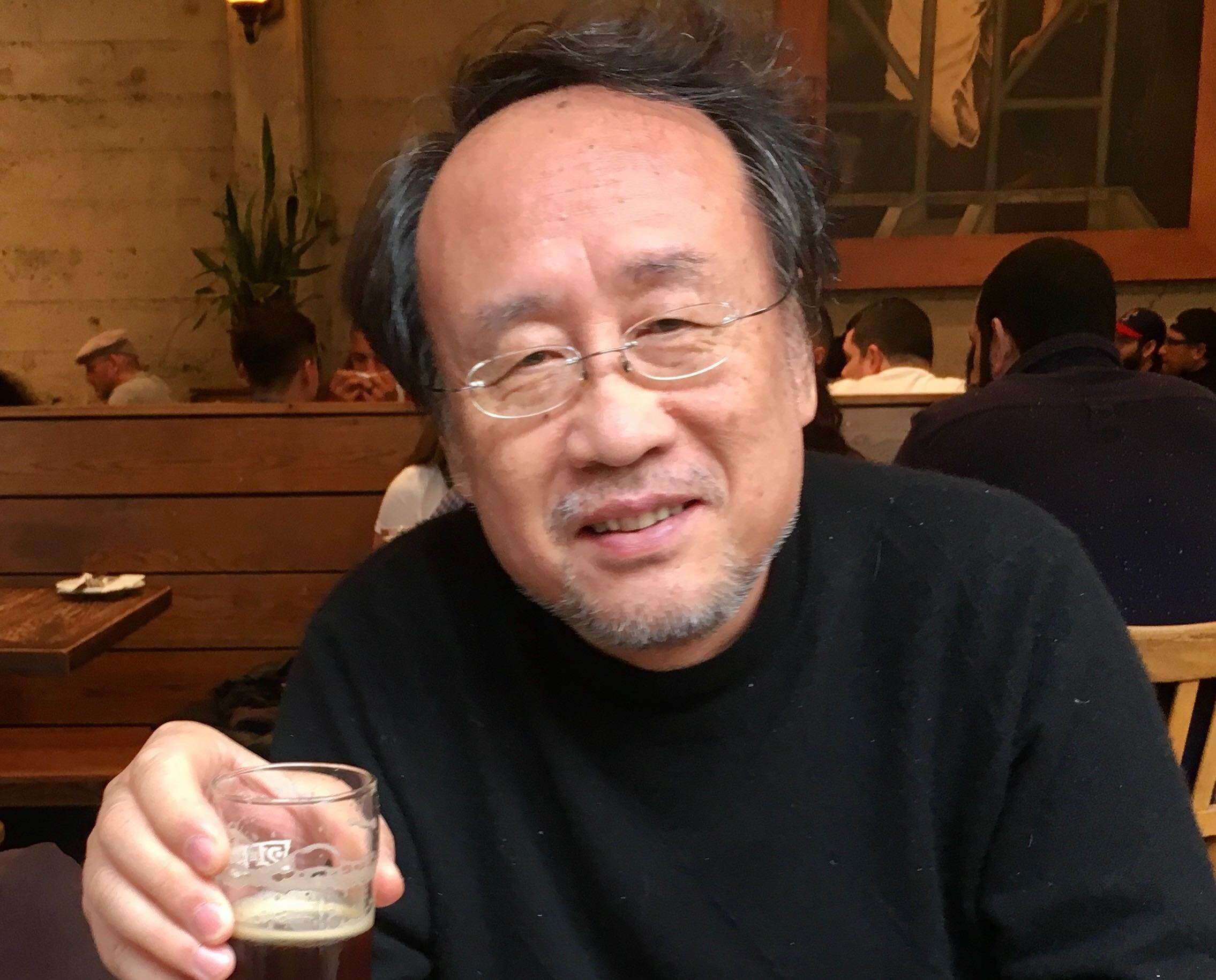
- Yan Xiao at 21st Amendment Brewery in San Francisco (January 2019)

Yan Xiao is an engineer and Professor of Civil Engineering at USC. He is best known for inventing structural uses for bamboo.

He describes his research interests as "seismic analysis and design of structures; experimental analysis of structures, components and materials, and implementation of new materials into structural design and retrofit."

In 2006, Xiao developed a bamboo derived material known as GluBam that was strong enough to be used for beams and trusses. He was able to build a 33-foot heavy use bridge, capable of supporting 8 tons, in Leiyang, Hunan, using the material. A principal advantage of GluBam is construction of large structures such as a bridge doesn't require heavy machinery. The bridge was assembled in a quick 10 days. In addition to the machinery and speed requirements, the GluBam beams cost 20 percent as what imported lumber costs. Rural China also has a constantly replenishing supply of bamboo.

While on sabbatical in 2008, he created quick to build homes made from the material to be used as a rapid housing solution following the 2008 Sichuan earthquake which had left many homeless.

Xiao was featured in Popular Science's Top 100 Innovations of 2008 for "Glubam Construction: The Sustainable Bridge."
